Coșbuc (until 1925 Hordou;) is a commune in Bistrița-Năsăud County, Transylvania, Romania. Since the village of Bichigiu was transferred to Telciu commune in 2004, Coșbuc remains the commune's only village.

The poet George Coșbuc was born here in 1866.

References

Communes in Bistrița-Năsăud County
Localities in Transylvania